The 1895 Iowa gubernatorial election was held on November 5, 1895. Republican nominee Francis M. Drake defeated Democratic nominee Washington I. Babb with 52.00% of the vote.

General election

Candidates
Major party candidates
Francis M. Drake, Republican
Washington I. Babb, Democratic 

Other candidates
Sylvester B. Crane, People's
Francis Bacon, Prohibition

Results

References

1895
Iowa